Air Chief Marshal Fadjar Prasetyo (born 9 April 1966) is an Indonesian air chief marshal who is currently Chief of Staff of the Indonesian Air Force.

Career
Fadjar was born in Jakarta on 9 April 1966 and graduated from the Indonesian Air Force Academy in 1988. He began his air force career as an A-4 Skyhawk pilot between 1990 and 1995 at Hasanuddin Air Base, then was reassigned to Halim Air Base where he became an aviation officer aboard Fokker F28 and Boeing 707 planes. He then piloted a Boeing 737

Afterwards, he was assigned to the Indonesian Embassy in Malaysia as a defense attache for air force. Other positions he had taken included being head of training of the air force and a wing commander at Halim. In 2016, he was appointed the commander at Halim Airbase, being ranked an air commodore by the end of his tenure, and between 2018 and 2019 he served as commander of operational zones 2 (2018) and 1 (2018–2019) of the airforce. Shortly before his appointment as Chief of Staff, he was joint commander of defensive region 2, serving directly under the Commander of the Indonesian National Armed Forces. During this period, he was promoted to air marshal in November 2019.

He was appointed air force chief of staff on 20 May 2020, and received a promotion to a four-star rank (air chief marshal) alongside. Shortly after he was sworn in, he released a 100-day program as chief of staff, which included among others managing the impact of the ongoing COVID-19 pandemic. In September 2020, Fadjar inaugurated a cyber unit (Satsiber) for the Indonesian Air Force.

References

Living people
1966 births
People from Jakarta
Indonesian Air Force air marshals
Chiefs of Staff of the Indonesian Air Force